Michael Saucedo (born July 11, 1970)  is an American actor  best known for his role  on the soap opera General Hospital from 1999 until 2001, and he briefly returned in 2013 and 2014. He is also a musician and published author known for the "Liberty Strong" series.

Personal life
He is of Hispanic and Irish descent. After his parents divorced, Saucedo was raised by his mother. Saucedo has one brother and six half-siblings. They moved from Los Angeles to Grants Pass, Oregon, where he attended high school and was elected student body president. He joined garage bands in high school and showed no interest in acting. Saucedo attended Carleton College in Northfield, Minnesota and attained a B.A. in African-American studies.

After graduation, not knowing what to do with his life, he decided to act and returned to Los Angeles. He married General Hospital star Rebecca Herbst (who currently plays Elizabeth Webber) in June 2001. They have three children: Ethan Riley (born October 31, 2001), Ella Bailey (born April 12, 2004), and Emerson Truett (born August 9, 2010).  He also has a son from a previous relationship, Elijah Saucedo (born October 5, 1996).

Career
He began acting as a child in commercials, including one for Band-Aid. During high school, he became involved with garage bands, and only went back to acting after college. From 1999-2001, Saucedo was a cast member of General Hospital as Juan Santiago.

Filmography

References

External links
 

American male actors of Mexican descent
Hispanic and Latino American male actors
American people of Irish descent
American male television actors
American male soap opera actors
1970 births
Living people
Male actors from Oregon
People from Grants Pass, Oregon
Carleton College alumni